Stare Dolistowo  is a village in the administrative district of Gmina Jaświły, within Mońki County, Podlaskie Voivodeship, in north-eastern Poland.

The parish of Dolistowo was founded on February 6, 1500.

References
   

Stare Dolistowo
Belostoksky Uyezd
Białystok Voivodeship (1919–1939)
Belastok Region